Bachia dorbignyi, also known commonly as Dorbigny's bachia and lagarto-sem-pata in Brazilian Portuguese, is a species of lizard in the family Gymnophthalmidae. The species is native to central South America.

Etymology
The specific name, dorbignyi, is in honor of French Naturalist Alcide d'Orbigny.

Geographic range
B. dorbignyi is found in eastern Bolivia, western Brazil, and southeastern Peru.

Habitat
The preferred natural habitats of B. dorbignyi are forest and savanna.

Reproduction
B. dorbignyi is oviparous.

References

Further reading
Boulenger GA (1885). Catalogue of the Lizards in the British Museum (Natural History). Second Edition. Volume II. ... Teiidæ .... London: Trustees of the British Museum (Natural History). (Taylor and Francis, printers). xiii + 497 pp. + Plates I–XXIV. (Cophias dorbignyi, new combination, p. 419).
Castrillon ME, Strussmann C (1998). "Nova espécie de Bachia e a presença de B. Dorbignyi (Duméril & Bibron) no sudoeste de Mato Grosso, Brasil (Sauria, Gymnopthalmidae)". Revista Brasileira de Zoologia 15 (3): 567–581. (in Portuguese, with an abstract in English).
Duméril AMC, Bibron G (1839). Erpétologie générale ou Histoire naturelle complète des Reptiles. Tome cinquième [Volume 5]. Paris: Roret. viii + 854 pp. ("Chalcides Dorbignyi ", new species, pp. 462–463. (in French).
Gray JE (1845). Catalogue of the Specimens of Lizards in the Collection of the British Museum. London: Trustees of the British Museum. (Edward Newman, printer). xxviii + 289 pp. ("Bachia D'Orbignii ", new combination, p. 58).  

Bachia
Reptiles described in 1839
Taxa named by André Marie Constant Duméril
Taxa named by Gabriel Bibron